Emilio Del Bono (born 26 November 1965) is an Italian politician from the Democratic Party and current Mayor of Brescia.

Biography 
After graduating in Law at the University of Milan, Del Bono entered into politics being elected city councillor of Brescia, being very close to former minister and then Mayor Mino Martinazzoli. From 1993 to 1994, Del Bono was the provincial secretary of the Christian Democracy in the province of Brescia, and then he was appointed the provincial secretary of the Italian People's Party.

In the 1996 general election, Del Bono was elected to the Chamber of Deputies with the Olive Tree, being later re-elected in the 2001 and the 2006 election.

In 2008, Del Bono decided not to run in the 2008 general election since he became the Democratic Party candidate for the office of Mayor of Brescia but was defeated by the People of Freedom candidate Adriano Paroli.

In 2013 Del Bono once again challenged Paroli for the office of Mayor of Brescia and managed to win on the runoff. He was re-elected Mayor on the first round in the 2018 local elections.

Just a few months before the expiration of his second term as mayor, Del Bono was elected member of the Regional Council of Lombardy with more than 35,000 preferences, being also the most voted candidate of any party in the election. On 15 March 2023 he was elected Vice President of the Regional Council.

Electoral history

References

External links 
Official website
Files about his parliamentary activities (in Italian): XIII, XIV, XV legislature

1965 births
Living people
Christian Democracy (Italy) politicians
Italian People's Party (1994) politicians
Democracy is Freedom – The Daisy politicians
Democratic Party (Italy) politicians
20th-century Italian politicians
21st-century Italian politicians
Mayors of Brescia
University of Milan alumni